The WNBA Draft is an annual draft held by the Women's National Basketball Association (WNBA) through which WNBA teams can select new players from a talent pool of college and professional women's basketball players. The 2005 edition was the ninth in the WNBA's history.

2005 WNBA Draft

On April 16, 2005 the WNBA draft took place at the NBA Entertainment Studios in Secaucus, New Jersey. 
The first round of the draft was televised on ESPN2.

Key

Draft selections

Round 1

Notes:

Round 2

Round 3

References

Women's National Basketball Association Draft
Draft
WNBA draft
Basketball in New Jersey